Kurt Brugger (born 17 March 1969 in Bruneck, South Tyrol) is an Italian luger and coach who competed from 1987 to 2003. Together with Wilfried Huber, he won the men's doubles event at the 1994 Winter Olympics in Lillehammer. He competed in four Winter Olympics: 1988, 1992, 1994 and 1998.

Brugger originally competed in both singles and doubles, making his debut in both in the Luge World Cup in 1986–87 season, but soon focused on doubles, in which he took his first podium with a second place in Olang in 1987, and his first win in Sarajevo in 1988. He also took two medals at the World Junior Championships in Olang in 1988, a gold in the singles and a bronze in the doubles.

Brugger also won three medals in the men's doubles event at the FIL World Luge Championships with one silver (1990) and two bronzes (1993, 1995) as well as a silver medal in the mixed team event (1995). At the FIL European Luge Championships, he won four medals with one gold (Mixed team: 1994) and three silvers (Men's doubles: 1992, 1994; Mixed team: 1998).

Brugger's best overall finish in the Luge World Cup men's doubles was second four times (1989–90, 1992–3, 1994–5, 1997-8).

He retired from competition after the 2002–03 season. He subsequently engaged in mountaineering, with his most significant achievement being scaling the Himalayan peak of Nanga Parbat. He has also served on the staff of the Italian luge team, and was appointed head coach in 2013.

References
1988 luge men's singles results
1988 luge men's doubles results
1992 luge men's doubles results
1998 luge men's doubles results

FIL-Luge profile

External links
 
 
 

1969 births
Living people
Italian male lugers
Lugers at the 1988 Winter Olympics
Lugers at the 1992 Winter Olympics
Lugers at the 1994 Winter Olympics
Lugers at the 1998 Winter Olympics
Olympic lugers of Italy
Olympic medalists in luge
Medalists at the 1994 Winter Olympics
Olympic gold medalists for Italy
Italian sports coaches
Italian mountain climbers
Sportspeople from Bruneck
Germanophone Italian people
20th-century Italian people